George B. McClellan (1826–1885) was an American Civil War military leader, presidential candidate and Governor of New Jersey.

George McClellan may also refer to:

George McClellan (physician) (1796–1847), American physician and founder of Jefferson Medical College and the Medical Department of Pennsylvania College
George McClellan (New York politician) (1856–1927), American Democratic legislator and lawyer
George B. McClellan Jr. (1865–1940), American Democratic legislator and academic; mayor of New York City; Princeton lecturer and professor
George McClellan (police officer) (1908–1982), Canadian police official; Canada's first provincial Ombudsman
George McClellan (anatomy professor) (1849–1913), American medical doctor
George B. McClellan (fireboat), a fireboat operated by the FDNY
General George B. McClellan (Ellicott), an equestrian bronze sculpture by Henry Jackson Ellicott

See also

McClellan (disambiguation)